L. Ron Hubbard used the term Incident in a specific context for auditing in Scientology and Dianetics: the description of space operatic events in the Universe's distant past, involving alien interventions in past lives. It is a basic belief of Scientology that a human being is an immortal spiritual being, termed a thetan, trapped on planet Earth in a "meat body".

Although said to be capable of occurring anywhere and at any time, Hubbard's writings described some incidents in particular, set in Earth's prehistory. Many of them first appeared in Hubbard's book What to Audit (later retitled A History of Man).

In his writings and lectures, Hubbard describes Incidents said to have occurred to thetans during the past few trillion years. Most of these followed a consistent pattern, wherein a hostile alien civilization captured and brainwashed free thetans. Often, instances of implantation are termed Incidents, while the subject of the implants are often termed Goals. Some Incidents are simply unusual and traumatic events, whereof the memory is said to linger for trillions of years. According to Hubbard, only Scientology's methods can remove the resulting neuroses.

A History of Man Incidents

Before Earth and Before MEST
"There is a Before Earth and a Before MEST Universe in all banks. The incidents are not dissimilar. They consist of the preclear being summoned before a council, being frowned down, being sent elsewhere than where he was... the council's intent is to reduce the person downscale in order to get a more obedient colonist."

Body Builder Incident
The Body Builder Incident took place around fifty million years ago and variants of it are said by Hubbard to have recurred often, wherein the thetan was forced to fight with his own "attention units" and build a MEST body from them.

Bodies in pawn
"Bodies in pawn result" from a "very gruesome experience" in which:

a fellow is grabbed, hypnotized, shoved into an electronic field, and then told he is somewhere else. And so he departs—most of him—and goes to the new location while still being under control of the implanters. He picks up a MEST [physical] body in the new location and starts living a life there, while still having a living body somewhere else. The implanters can keep his original body alive indefinitely, and control the thetan through it. If the thetan tries to flee, the hypnotizers simply cause pain to the original body, still alive in a vat of fluid, and he is immediately recalled. That's a BODY IN PAWN. It's a second body you may have, living somewhere else, right in present time. But the second body is not under YOUR direct control.
(Source magazine #105, pg.39, 1997; see also Hubbard, Research and Discovery Series vol. 10)

They can apparently cause major problems for people undergoing medical operations, as "pain, an anaesthetic or a serious accident cause him to change to the other area with a shocking impact on the other body. The other body quite commonly dies or is deranged by the sudden impact". This gives the patient a repressed feeling of having died and leaves him "very, very badly disturbed".

Fly Trap (Bubble Gum Incident)
The Bubble Gum Incident was an important early incident "where you are hit with a motion and finally develop an obsession about motion". It was the first incident on the "whole track" which included words.

Hubbard openly acknowledged the absurdity of the name, ironically noting: "I wish you to carefully note these very technical terms like bubble gum", to which the audience laughs heartily.<ref>Dianetics and Scientology Technical Dictionary, first edition, 1975, pg. 55</ref>

In his book A History of Man, Hubbard referred to the Bubble Gum Incident as "The Fly Trap": "Very, very early on the track, a long time before the present populace came into being, there was a theta trap called the Fly Trap. It was of a gummy material... also called the 'Bubble Gum' incident, because every time a thetan pushes against it, it pushes back and it finally gives him an obsession about motion".

Coffee Grinder
Hubbard gave the name "The Coffee Grinder" to the MEST aspect of the Fourth Invader Force's Fac One, which he termed "an outright control mechanism, invented to cut down rebel raids on invader installations". It was "originally laid down in this galaxy about one million years ago", says Hubbard, and consists of "a two-handled, portable machine which, when turned, emits a heavy push-pull electronic wave in a series of stuttering 'baps'".

"The invader gratuitously left these machines around for the yokels. Believing that the treatment was vital to get to heaven or some such thing, the yokels practiced on each other, found new victims and generally spread the implant around."

Ice Cube Incident
A Xenu-like story in which alien invaders in flying saucers "plant" living entities. Says Hubbard in A History of Man: "Here is an intriguing incident which, if your preclear demands, should be audited. This is evidently a method of transportation of beings to a new area. The being is packed in ice, is taken to the new area and is usually dumped in the ocean. Your preclear, if he has this one in restimulation, has very cold hands and feet chronically".

Hubbard also notes: "The new crew in the area is later quite surprised to find that their planted beings, so carefully dumped in the sea from a saucer, are being picked up between lives and given "treatment" by an old, established invader whose methods of political control are long since established".

Jack-in-the-Box
According to Hubbard, "here we have an invader trick, a method of trapping thetans", wherein the alien invaders trick the thetans into gathering an endless loop of facsimile pictures and confusing themselves, ultimately ending in an explosion. Hubbard warns auditors, "You will find a preclear with this in restimulation to be very curious about cereal boxes which have pictures of cereal boxes which have pictures of cereal boxes".

OT III Incidents

These incidents are described in the material for Operating Thetan level III and are audited on that level.

Incident I
Incident I is set four quadrillion years ago, wherein an unsuspecting thetan was subjected to a loud snapping noise, followed by a flood of luminescence, then saw a chariot followed by a trumpeting cherub. After a loud set of snaps, the thetan was overwhelmed by darkness. This is described as the implant opening the gateway to the present universe, separating thetans from their static (natural/godlike) state. The incident is described in Operating Thetan level III (OT III), written in 1967.

R6 Implants (Incident II)
The R6 Implants were the work of the Galactic Confederacy's tyrannical leader, Xenu, 75 million years ago. According to Hubbard, Xenu destroyed billions of captured subjects during Incident II by dropping them into volcanoes and attacking them with nuclear weapons.  The subjects, once disembodied, were forced to watch a "three-D, super colossal motion picture" for thirty-six days. This implanted pictures "contain[ing] God, the Devil, Angels, space opera, theaters, helicopters, a constant spinning, a spinning dancer, trains and various scenes very like modern England."

Routine 3N Incidents

Aircraft Door Goals
The Aircraft Door Goals were implanted between 315 trillion years ago and 216 trillion years ago aboard the fuselage of an aircraft, with the subject thetan held motionless in front of the aircraft door. Hubbard writes that "the goal items were laid in with explosions". The specific goals given in this implant were variants of the command "to create".

Gorilla Goals

According to Scientology, the Gorilla Goals were a series of implants created by invaders from Helatrobus "between about 319 trillion years ago to about 256 trillion trillion years ago". They were
given in an amusement park with a single tunnel, a roller coaster and a Ferris wheel.... The symbol of a Gorilla was always present in the place the goal was given. Sometimes a large gorilla, black, was seen elsewhere than the park. A mechanical or a live gorilla was always seen in the park. This activity was conducted by the Hoipolloi, a group of operators in meat body societies. They were typical carnival people. They let out concessions for these implant "Amusement Parks." A pink-striped white shirt with sleeve garters was the uniform of the Hoipolloi. Such a figure often rode on the roller coaster cars. Monkeys were also used on the cars. Elephants sometimes formed part of the equipment.

The Hoipolloi used "fantastic motion" as well as "blasts of raw electricity and explosions" to brainwash the thetans into accepting the Gorilla Goals, with the goals including "To End", "To be Dead", "To be Asleep", "To be Solid", "To be Sexual" and so on.

Bear Goals
The Bear Goals were very similar to the Gorilla Goals, except that "instead of a mechanical gorilla a mechanical or live bear was used, and the motion was even more violent". They were implanted by "a group called "The Brothers of the Bear" and were the ancestors of the Hoipolloi".

Invisible Picture Goals
The Invisible Picture Goals were implanted by an early race of alien implanters some time between "110,000 trillion trillion years ago or earlier to 390 trillion trillion years ago". They comprised brainwashing of captive thetans by showing them pictures of diametrically opposed goals such as "Wake, Never Wake, Sleep, Never Sleep", as well as invisible pictures to confuse the thetan. The other pictures would "consist usually of a scene of a cave, a railway, an airplane, a view of a sun and planets".

Train Goals
Devised by the Marcabians and implemented between "hundreds of years ago to hundreds of thousands of years ago", the Train Goals were a series of implants given in a huge train station. The thetan was put into "a railway carriage quite like a British railway coach with compartments" and subjected to a barrage of "white energy". During the implant sequence:
a face may come up and say "You still here? Get out. Get off this train. We hate you." And from the speakers "This happened to you yesterday, tomorrow, now. This is your departure point, keep coming back. You'll be meeting all your friends here. When you're killed and dead keep coming back. You haven't a chance to get away. You've got to report in. This happened to you days ago, weeks ago, years ago. You don't know when this happened to you. We hate you. Get out. Don't ever come back." 

Black Thetan Goals
The Black Thetan Goals, also known as the Glade Implants, were implanted between "390 trillion trillion years to 370 trillion trillion years ago". According to Hubbard, they were "in a glade surrounded by the stone heads of "black thetans" who spat white energy at the trapped thetan". The goals included such things as "To End, To be Dead, To be Asleep" and so on.

Heaven Implants
The Heaven Implants were given "43,891,832,611,177 years, 344 days, 10 hours, 20 minutes and 40 seconds from 10: P.M. Daylight Greenwich Time May 9, 1963." They comprised two series of views of Heaven, the first of which was quite positive: Hubbard compares Heaven to "Busch Gardens in Pasadena". In the second series, Heaven had become a lot shabbier:

The place is shabby. The vegetation is gone. The pillars are scruffy. The saints have vanished. So have the Angels. A sign on one (the left as you "enter") says "This is Heaven". The right has a sign "Hell" with an arrow and inside the grounds one can see the excavations like archaeological diggings with raw terraces, that lead to "Hell".

Hubbard reported that he had encountered no "devils or satans". Heaven was, however, not quite as conventionally depicted, and took the form of a town which "consisted of a trolley bus, some building fronts, sidewalks, train tracks, a boarding house, a bistro in a basement where there is a 'bulletin board' well lighted, and a BANK BUILDING." Hubbard described how the second series of Heaven implants depicts:

a passenger getting on the trolley bus, a "workman" halfway down the first stairs of To Forget "eating lunch" and in To Be in Heaven a gardener or electrician adjusting an implant box behind a hedge and periodically leaping up and screaming.("Heaven", HCOB May 11, 1963)

After being ridiculed in the Anderson Report (an Australian public inquiry into Scientology), this bulletin was withdrawn from circulation.

Helatrobus Implants
These were implanted by the inhabitants of the planet Helatrobus, some "382 trillion years ago to 52 trillion years ago". The Helatrobans were motivated by a fear of free thetans and sought to restrain them by capturing and brainwashing thetans in order to weaken them. In a series of lectures, Hubbard goes into some detail about how this was done:

Planets were surrounded suddenly by radioactive cloud masses. And very often a long time before the planet came under attack from these implant people, waves of radioactive clouds, Magellanic clouds, black and gray, would sweep over and engulf the planet, and it would be living in an atmosphere of radioactivity, which was highly antipathetic to the living beings, bodies, plants, anything else that was on this planet.
And so planetary systems would become engulfed in radioactive masses, gray and black. And the earmarks of such a planetary action was gray and black – gray towering masses of clouds. These Magellanic clouds would not otherwise have come anywhere near a planetary system.("State of OT")

When a planet had been engulfed, the Helatrobans would attack it with "little orange-colored bombs that would talk" and the clouds themselves would talk: "And here you'd have a gray cloud going by and it'd be saying, 'Hark! Hark! Hark!' you see? 'Watch out! Look out! Who's there? Who's that?'"

Hapless people on the planet's surface would be kidnapped using a small capsule "placed at will in space. It shot out a large bubble, the being would grab at the bubble or strike at it and be sucked at once into the capsule. Then the capsule would be retracted into an aircraft." A victim would then be implanted for up to six months and the Helatrobans would "fix him on a post in a big bunch of stuff ... put him on a post and wobbled him around and ran him through this implant of goals on a little monowheel. Little monowheel pole trap. And it had the effigy of a body on it." ("State of OT")

Obscene Dog Incident
In the "Assists" lecture of October 3, 1968, Hubbard described a surreal cosmological event said to take place shortly after Incident I (the creation of the universe): "There's the incident called "The Obscene Dog" which is just a little bit later than Incident One. And sometimes actually by running it, why you can get the PC into Incident One. The Obscene Dog was a sort of a brass dog in a sitting position and anybody who got around to the front of the dog got caught in some electronic current and passed through the dog to the dog's rear end and spat out. Thetans didn't like this."

See also
 Space opera in Scientology scripture
 Marcab Confederacy
 Helatrobus
 Implant (Scientology)
 Xenu

Notes

Note: HCOB refers to "Hubbard Communications Office Bulletins", HCOPL refers to "Hubbard Communications Office Policy Letters", and SHSBC refers to "Saint Hill Special Briefing Courses". All have been made publicly available by the Church of Scientology in the past, both as individual documents or in bound volumes.

References

Lectures by Hubbard
"Electropsychometric Scouting: Battle of the Universes", April 1952
"Technique 88 and the Whole Track Part I", 26 June 1952
"The Role of Earth", November 1952
Philadelphia Doctorate Course (PDC), 1 December 1952
"History and development of processes: question and answer period", 17 December 1954
"Create and Confront", 3 January 1960
"E-Meter Actions, Errors in Auditing", 12 June 1961
"The Helatrobus Implants", 21 May 1963
"State of OT", 23 May 1963
"The Free Being", 9 July 1963
"Auditing Comm Cycles", 6 August 1963
"The ITSA Line", 21 August 1963
"Org Board and Livingness", 6 April 1965
"Assists" lecture. 3 October 1968, #10 in the Class VIII series. (Audio extracts)

HCO Bulletins
"Heaven", HCOB May 11, 1963 (no longer published by the Church of Scientology)
"Routine 3N: Line Plots", HCOB 14 July 1963
"Routine 3N - The Train GPMs - The Marcab Between Lives Implants", HCOB 24 August 1963

Books
 Jon Atack, A Piece Of Blue Sky (Kensington Publishing Corporation, New York, 1990)
 Bent Corydon and L. Ron Hubbard Jr., L. Ron Hubbard: Messiah Or Madman? (Lyle Stuart, New Jersey, 1987)
 L. Ron Hubbard, Scientology: A History of Man, 1954
 L. Ron Hubbard, Dianetics and Scientology Technical Dictionary (current edition, Bridge Publications, 1995)
 L. Ron Hubbard, Scientology 8-8008 (current edition, Bridge Publications, 1989)
 Russell Miller, Bare-Faced Messiah: The True Story Of L. Ron Hubbard  (Henry Holt, New York, 1988)
 Christopher Partridge, UFO Religions (Routledge, 2003)

Other references
Church of Scientology, International Scientology News #3 (1997)
Lure of the celebrity sect (Jamie Doward, The Observer, Sun 16 May 2004)
Marco Frenschkowski: L. Ron Hubbard and Scientology'', Marburg Journal of Religion, Volume 4, No. 1 (July 1999)
Hubbard, "The Story of a Static", Professional Auditor's Bulletin 1 February 1957

Scientology beliefs and practices